Catherine of Clermont (French: Catherine de Clermont; ? – 19/20 September 1212/1213) was the ruling Countess of Clermont-en-Beauvaisis in her own right in 1191-1213. She was also the Countess of Blois by marriage.

Biography 

Catherine was the eldest child of Raoul I, Count of Clermont-en-Beauvaisis and his wife, Countess Alix. Catherine’s brother Philippe died before Raoul, and Catherine became the Countess of Clermont-en-Beauvaisis after her father’s death.

The husband of Catherine was Louis I, Count of Blois, a grandson of the King of France. Catherine bore three children to her husband; one of them was Theobald VI, Count of Blois.

References

Sources

Counts of Clermont-en-Beauvaisis
Countesses of Chartres
1213 deaths
12th-century women rulers
13th-century women rulers